Ben Alloway (born 19 February 1981) is an Australian mixed martial artist. A professional MMA competitor since 2010, he was a competitor on The Ultimate Fighter: The Smashes. Ben formerly fought for the UFC in the welterweight division.

Mixed martial arts career

Early career
Alloway compiled a 12–3 professional record competing mostly in Australia before joining The Ultimate Fighter.

Alloway was forced to work outside of martial arts for most of his early career, but after signing with the UFC was able to devote 100% of his time to his MMA training.

The Ultimate Fighter
Alloway was chosen to compete on The Ultimate Fighter: The Smashes. In his first fight in the house, Alloway knocked out Valentino Petrescu early in the second round to advance to the quarterfinals.

In his quarterfinal fight, Alloway came up short, losing via split decision to Brad Scott.

Ultimate Fighting Championship
Alloway made his UFC debut against castmate Manuel Rodriguez on 15 December 2012 at UFC on FX 6. He won the fight via KO in the first round.

Alloway faced promotional newcomer Ryan LaFlare on 6 April 2013 at UFC on Fuel TV 9. He lost the fight via unanimous decision.

Alloway next faced TUF 17 contestant Zak Cummings at UFC Fight Night 27. He lost the fight via submission in the first round, and was cut from the UFC.

Cage Warriors Fighting Championships
Following his release from the UFC, Alloway signed a five-fight deal with leading European promotion Cage Warriors

Alloway made his Cage Warriors debut against Jack Mason on 1 March 2014 at Cage Warriors 65. He won the fight via unanimous decision.

Absolute Championship Berkut

At ACB he lost the first fight to Sharaf Davlatmurodov at ACB 41 on 15 July 2016 via TKO in the second round.

Alloway faced Sergey Khandozhko at ACB 48 Revenge on 22 October 2016. He won the fight via submission (rear-naked choke) in the third round.

Alloway faced Ismail Naurdiev at ACB 60 on 13 May 2017. He lost the fight via knockout in the first round.

Championships and accomplishments
BRACE
BRACE Welterweight Championship – (One time, current)
Ultimate Fighting Championship
The Ultimate Fighter: The Smashes – Fight of the Season
Knockout of the Night – (One Time)

Mixed martial arts record

|-
| Loss
| align=center| 19–9
| Steve Kennedy
| Submission (kimura)
| Eternal MMA 44
| 
| align=center| 2
| align=center| 1:35
| Perth, Western Australia, Australia
|
|-
| Loss
| align=center| 19–8
| Ismail Naurdiev
| TKO (body kick)
| ACB 60
| 
| align=center| 1
| align=center| 2:24
| Vienna, Austria
|
|-
| Win
| align=center| 19–7
| Sergey Khandozhko
| Submission (rear-naked choke)
| ACB 48: Revenge
| 
| align=center| 3
| align=center| 3:09
| Moscow, Russia
|
|-
| Win
| align=center| 18–7
| Matt Vaile
| Decision (unanimous)
| CITC – Carnage in the Cage 7
| 
| align=center| 3
| align=center| 5:00
| Mackay, Queensland, Australia
|
|-
| Loss
| align=center| 17–7
| Sharaf Davlatmurodov
| TKO (body kick)
| ACB 41: The Path to Triumph
| 
| align=center| 2
| align=center| 2:39
| Sochi, Russia
|
|-
| Win
| align=center| 17–6
| Theo Christakos 
| KO (punches)
| BRACE 37: 2015 Championship Grand Final
| 
| align=center| 3
| align=center| 1:28
| Canberra, Australia
| 
|-
| Win
| align=center| 16–6
| Rick Alchin
| Submission (guillotine choke)
| BRACE 36
| 
| align=center| 2
| align=center| 3:03
| Sydney, Australia
| 
|-
| Win
| align=center| 15–6
| Tristan Murphy 
| TKO (punches and elbows)
| Eternal MMA 10
| 
| align=center| 2
| align=center| 1:20
| Gold Coast, Queensland, Australia
|
|-
| Loss
| align=center| 14–6
| Mohsen Bahari
| Decision (split)
| Cage Warriors Fighting Championship 69
| 
| align=center| 3
| align=center| 5:00
| London, England
| 
|-
|Win
|align=center|14–5
|Jack Mason
|Decision (unanimous)
|Cage Warriors Fighting Championship 65
|
|align=center|3
|align=center|5:00
|Dublin, Leinster, Ireland 
|
|-
|Loss
|align=center|13–5
|Zak Cummings
|Submission (d'arce choke)
|UFC Fight Night: Condit vs. Kampmann 2
|
|align=center|1
|align=center|4:19
|Indianapolis, Indiana, United States
|
|-
|Loss
|align=center|13–4
|Ryan LaFlare
|Decision (unanimous)
|UFC on Fuel TV: Mousasi vs. Latifi
|
|align=center|3
|align=center|5:00
|Stockholm, Sweden
|
|-
|Win
|align=center|13–3
|Manuel Rodriguez
|KO (front kick and punches)
|UFC on FX: Sotiropoulos vs. Pearson
|
|align=center|1
|align=center|4:57
|Gold Coast, Queensland, Australia
|
|-
|Win
|align=center|12–3
|Rod Staader
|TKO (punches)
|BRACE 15
|
|align=center|2
|align=center|3:39
|Coffs Harbour, New South Wales, Australia
|
|-
|Win
|align=center|11–3
|Mauro Chimento Jr.
|Decision (unanimous)
|Cage Warriors Fight Night 3
|
|align=center|3
|align=center|5:00
|Beirut, Lebanon
|
|-
|Win
|align=center|10–3
|Rashid Abdullah
|Submission (armbar)
|FMMMA- Fight Me MMA
|
|align=center|2
|align=center|4:18
|St. Charles, Missouri, United States
|
|-
|Win
|align=center|9–3
|Dan Hyatt
|Submission (triangle choke)
|BRACE 13
|
|align=center|1
|align=center|3:49
|Townsville, Queensland, Australia
|
|-
|Win
|align=center|8–3
|Corey Nelson
|Decision (majority)
|BRACE 11
|
|align=center|3
|align=center|5:00
|Brisbane, Queensland, Australia
|
|-
|Loss
|align=center|7–3
|Ben Mortimer
|Submission (armbar)
|Nitro MMA- Nitro 3
|
|align=center|3
|align=center|1:49
|Logan City, Queensland, Australia
|
|-
|Loss
|align=center|7–2
|Robert Whittaker
|Submission (rear-naked choke)
|Cage Fighting Championship 17
|
|align=center|2
|align=center|4:07
|Gold Coast, Queensland, Australia
|
|-
|Win
|align=center|7–1
|Jon Leven
|Submission (rear-naked choke)
|Fate MMA- Fate 2
|
|align=center|3
|align=center|3:33
|Beenleigh, Queensland, Australia
|
|-
|Win
|align=center|6–1
|Gokhan Turkyilmaz
|TKO (punches)
|CWA – Cage Wars Australia 5
|
|align=center|3
|align=center|3:33
|Gold Coast, Queensland, Australia
|
|-
|Win
|align=center|5–1
|Michael Osborn
|TKO (punches)
|C3 Fights – Slammin Jammin Weekend 6
|
|align=center|3
|align=center|2:29
|Newkirk, Oklahoma, United States
|
|-
|Loss
|align=center|4–1
|Luke Peters
|Submission (guillotine choke)
|BRACE 5
|
|align=center|1
|align=center|4:50
|Brisbane, Queensland, Australia
|
|-
|Win
|align=center|4–0
|Atal Kakar
|Submission (rear-naked choke)
|XMMA 2 – ANZ VS USA
|
|align=center|1
|align=center|1:41
|Sydney, Australia
|
|-
|Win
|align=center|3–0
|Rick Evans
|TKO (punches)
|Fate MMA – Beyond Human Control
|
|align=center|1
|align=center|N/A
|Beenleigh, Queensland, Australia
|
|-
|Win
|align=center|2–0
|Jordan Wainohu
|TKO (punches)
|FWC5 – Call To Arms
|
|align=center|2
|align=center|2:56
|Nerang, Queensland, Australia
|
|-
|Win
|align=center|1–0
|Ben Pepper
|Decision (unanimous)
|UMMA 4 – Toowoomba
|
|align=center|3
|align=center|5:00
|Toowoomba, Queensland, Australia
|
|-

Mixed martial arts exhibition record

|-
| Loss
| align=center| 1–1
| Brad Scott
| Decision (split)
| The Ultimate Fighter: The Smashes
| 
| align=center| 3
| align=center| 5:00
| Australia
| 
|-
| Win
| align=center| 1–0
| Valentino Petrescu
| TKO (punches)
| The Ultimate Fighter: The Smashes
| 
| align=center| 2
| align=center| 0:42
| Australia
|
|-

References

External links
 
 
 

Living people
1981 births
Australian male mixed martial artists
Mixed martial artists from the Gold Coast
Welterweight mixed martial artists
Ultimate Fighting Championship male fighters